CFF may refer to:

Arts, entertainment, and media
 Celebrity Family Feud, a 2008 NBC game show hosted by Al Roker
 Charcoal Feather Federation, an anime television series by Yoshitoshi ABe

Computing
 Common File Format, a video file format that is part of the UltraViolet digital rights authentication and licensing system
 Compact Font Format, a font technology

Events
 Chattanooga Film Festival, an annual film festival in Chattanooga, Tennessee
 Chicago Fringe Festival, an annual performing arts festival in Chicago, Illinois

Organizations and enterprises
 Cambodian Freedom Fighters, a militant rebel group
 Central Facility for Funds, a post-trade service by Clearstream
 Swiss Federal Railways, (French: Chemins de fer fédéraux suisses)
 Children First Foundation
 Children's Film Foundation
 Cornish Fighting Fund, a campaign for Cornish recognition
 Croatian Football Federation, the governing body of football in Croatia
 Cystic Fibrosis Foundation
 Climate Focused Future, a youth climate podcast and website

Other uses
 Cafunfo Airport, an Angolan airport with this IATA code
 Certified in Financial Forensics, a specialty designation for Certified Public Accountants awarded by the AICPA
 Consistent Force Field, a force field in molecular mechanics
 Critical flicker fusion rate or threshold, a concept in the psychophysics of vision